Lewis Ben Gilmore is an American politician serving as a member of the Arkansas Senate from the 26th district. Elected in November 2020, he assumed office on January 11, 2021.

Early life and education 
A native of Crossett, Arkansas, Gilmore attended Liberty University and the University of Arkansas at Monticello.

Career 
Gilmore served as a field representative for Congressman Bruce Westerman and as deputy chief of staff and communications director for Lieutenant Governor Tim Griffin. Gilmore was elected to the Arkansas Senate in November 2020 and assumed office on January 11, 2021.

References 

Living people
Republican Party Arkansas state senators
People from Crossett, Arkansas
Year of birth missing (living people)